Gwarzo is a Nigerian surname. Notable people with the surname include:

Bello Hayatu Gwarzo (born 1960), Nigerian politician
Ismaila Gwarzo, Nigerian National Security Advisor 

Surnames of Nigerian origin